Special Delivery is a 1955 American–West German comedy film, directed by John Brahm. It stars Joseph Cotten and Eva Bartok. Special Delivery was filmed simultaneously in an English- and German-language version.

Plot
Somewhere behind the Iron Curtain, mid 1950s. John Adams is a US embassy chargé d'affaires in a communist country in Eastern Europe. One day he has to deal with a very special case: in the front yard of the embassy, ​​a baby has been laid down, as if it had "fallen from heaven"! Nobody knows how it got there, nobody saw the person who put it there. A found object in the front yard of the embassy is not all that unusual, because many a person persecuted by the regime has thrown something over the embassy fence so that it does not fall into the hands of the communist cultural barbarians. For the embassy, with its six exclusively male employees, the baby poses a serious problem: what to do? The government of the Eastern European country immediately demands the extradition of the young "citizen" and immediately sends a stubborn state representative, Comrade Kovacs. Adams, on the other hand, decides to stonewall and not hand the baby over to the communists. In order to ensure the care of the little one, who is simply called Sam after Uncle Sam, the host country also provides its own nanny. Sonja Novaswobida, as she is called, is also supposed to collect further information on site on behalf of her government.

Due to mutual distrust, the men's relationships with the Eastern European state employee initially ranged from difficult to cold, especially since Kovacs turned out to be a particularly tough opponent for Ambassador Adams. He insists on returning the baby to the country as a kind of public property. Adams, however, wants to hand over just that, and instead, with some ironic ulterior motive, gives Adams another find that someone had thrown over the embassy's bridle: a supposedly ingenious, modern musical score that Kovacs plays the piano reluctantly at first, but then enthusiastically after realizing it must, how little the Americans can do with such modern music. Trust in one another begins to develop slowly. Tensions between the two governments are only resolved when the little one's parents are located. They are Olaf, the embassy's Swedish cook, and a woman from the host country who used to work here. Ambassador Adams now ensures in no time at all that marriage papers are issued to the parents, so that the toddler is considered a Swedish citizen and can leave the communist country with the parents in the direction of freedom. Adams' relationship with Sonja also soon goes beyond the purely official: both eventually become a couple.

Cast
 Joseph Cotten as John Adams
 Eva Bartok as Sonja
 Bob Cunningham as Captain Heinikan
 René Deltgen as Kovak
 Gert Fröbe as Olaf
 Bruni Löbel as Lila
 Ursula Herking as Madame Debrov

Production

It was filmed simultaneously in English- and German-language versions.

See also
 1955 in film
 List of comedy films of the 1950s
 List of German films 1945–1959

References

External links
 
 

1955 films
1955 comedy films
Films set in the 1950s
German comedy films
American comedy films
West German films
1950s German-language films
Cold War films
Films directed by John Brahm
Films set in Europe
American multilingual films
German multilingual films
Columbia Pictures films
1950s multilingual films
Films about orphans
1950s English-language films
1950s American films
German black-and-white films
American black-and-white films
1950s German films
Films scored by Bernhard Kaun
Films about babies